Al-Radd 'ala Ashab al-Hawa, better known as al-Sawad al-A'zam 'ala Madhhab al-Imam al-A'zam Abi Hanifa, is a book written by al-Hakim al-Samarqandi, and is considered as the oldest theological work in accordance with the Maturidite school, after Kitab al-Tawhid (The Book of Monotheism) by Abu Mansur al-Maturidi.

Contents 

In it al-Hakim al-Samarqandi has developed sixty-two credal statements, and states that the failure to observe them means that one cannot be regarded among the majority of Muslims (al-Sawad al-A'zam), an idea which he based on the Hadith containing al-Sawad al-A'zam (the great majority).

The text is a particularly important work in the development of Hanafi-Maturidi theology, as it attempts to faithfully represent the theological beliefs of Abu Hanifa two centuries after his death to a Persian/Central Asian audience then wrestling with the rise of Mu'tazili thought. The text was well-circulated in the centuries after its composition, both in the original Arabic and a Persian translation, along with a later Turkish translation during the Ottoman era.

Al-Sawad al-A'zam had been commissioned in the early part of the tenth century by Isma'il b. Ahmad (r.279/892–295/907), the real founder of the Samanid polity in Transoxiana and Khurasan, in order to define the parameters of the Sunni 'orthodoxy' the Samanids were committed to upholding. Blunt in style and authoritarian in tone, al-Sawad al-A'zam was in effect a Hanafite catechism consisting of responses to a large number of doctrinal questions. Like Tafsir al-Tabari, it was translated anonymously, indicating that its contents were not tied to any individual authorial view but rather represented the collective position of the Hanafite theologians of Transoxiana.

According to the introduction, the purpose of al-Sawad al-A'zam was to counter the growth of sectarianism in the Samanid realm by setting out clearly the consensus of the theologians of Central Asia regarding specific points of Hanafite doctrine. In the process of doing so, it condemned the beliefs of groups it deemed heretical. These included not just the usual Isma'ilis – but also Mu'tazilites, Kharijites, Murji'ites, Jabarites, Qadarites, and Karramites.

Influence and Popularity 
Kitab al-Sawad al-A'zam (The Book of the Great Masses) enshrined Hanafism in Transoxiana during the reign of the influential Samanids. As a result of the acceptance and influence of this statement of belief, the Turkic tribes north of Transoxiana were converted to Hanafism, including the Oghuz Turks, who would eventually become the great Seljuk rulers of Iran, Iraq, Syria, and Anatolia during the 11th to 13th centuries.

See also 
 Al-Aqidah al-Tahawiyyah
 Tabsirat al-Adilla
 List of Sunni books

Notes

References

External links 
 Abu al-Qasim Ishaq al-Hakim al-Samarqandi — Encyclopaedia Iranica

Sunni literature
Hanafi literature
Maturidi literature
Islamic theology books
Islamic belief and doctrine
Kalam